The King of Prussia Inn is a historic tavern in King of Prussia, Pennsylvania. It was listed on the National Register of Historic Places in 1975.

History

The original inn was constructed as a cottage in 1719 by the Welsh Quakers William and Janet Rees, founders of nearby Reesville. The cottage was converted to an inn in 1769 and was important in colonial times as it was approximately a day's travel by horse from Philadelphia. A number of settlers heading from there for Ohio would sleep at the inn for their first night on the road. In 1774 the Rees family hired James Barry (or Jimmy Berry) to run the inn, which henceforth became known as "Berry's Tavern". General George Washington first visited the tavern on Thanksgiving Day in 1777 while the Continental Army was encamped at Whitemarsh; a few weeks later Washington and the army bivouacked at nearby Valley Forge.

A map created by William Parker, an American Loyalist, listed the inn as "Berry's" in 1777, but a local petition in 1786 identified it as the "King of Prussia". It was possibly renamed to entice German soldiers fighting in the American Revolution to remain in this area. At some point a wooden signboard of the inn depicted King Frederick the Great of Prussia. The inn was listed on the U.S. National Register of Historic Places on December 23, 1975.

Diary of Johann Conrad Döhla

The King of Prussia Inn is mentioned in a 1778 entry from the diary of Johann Conrad Döhla, a soldier from Ansbach-Bayreuth who fought on the British side during the war:

Relocation

The inn was forced to move with the expansion of U.S. Route 202. U.S. 202 is a major north–south highway that passes through the town from southwest to northeast. Its construction as a modern expressway would have caused the destruction of the King of Prussia Inn; however, historic preservationists managed to prevail upon the Commonwealth of Pennsylvania to avoid this structure by building north and southbound lanes on either side of it.

The Commonwealth of Pennsylvania acquired the property on which the inn was located in 1952. For more than 50 years the inn was marooned on an artificial island, with cars and trucks roaring past it on both sides. It was sealed up for years, surrounded by a high fence. The inn was successfully relocated on August 20, 2000, and re-opened to the public in October 2002. The King of Prussia Chamber of Commerce (now the Montgomery County Chamber of Commerce) has occupied the building since the restoration.

References

External links
 

  At a Crossroads: The King of Prussia Inn, a National Park Service Teaching with Historic Places (TwHP) lesson plan

Hotel buildings on the National Register of Historic Places in Pennsylvania
Taverns in Pennsylvania
1719 establishments in Pennsylvania
American Revolutionary War sites
Buildings and structures in Montgomery County, Pennsylvania
Relocated buildings and structures in Pennsylvania
National Register of Historic Places in Montgomery County, Pennsylvania
Drinking establishments on the National Register of Historic Places in Pennsylvania
Upper Merion Township, Montgomery County, Pennsylvania